The Shigatse Photovoltaic Power Plant is a solar power plant located 3 km northwest of Shigatse, the second largest city in Tibet, China. It was connected to the grid in July 2011.

Description 

The plant sits in the industrial photovoltaic area of Shigatse about 3 km northwest of the city in the Xigaze Prefecture, at an altitude of 3895 meters. According to Suntech CEO, “with intense sunlight and cool temperatures, Tibet is extremely well-suited for the utilisation of advanced photovoltaic technology”. Tibet has abundant solar energy with more than 3,000 hours of sunshine annually.

Construction was undertaken by the Linuo Power Group, a provider of solar photovoltaic panels with headquarters in the Shandong province; the province has provided funding under the assistance program "Tibet2". The solar projects are intended to ease local power shortages. Panels are mounted on screw piles driven into the soil to a depth of 1.5 m, thus avoiding the use of concrete slabs.

The plant covers 30 hectares, and was connected to the grid in July 2011. It is expected to produce up to 20 million kWh per year.

In 2012, two other power projects were under construction in the industrial photovoltaic area of Shigatse, one by LDK Solar (60 MW), the other by Chaorisolar (10 MW).

References

See also

List of photovoltaic power stations

Photovoltaic power stations in China
Buildings and structures in Tibet
2011 establishments in China
Shigatse